Family Style is the second and final video album by Jet. The DVD also contains all the band's music videos from Get Born as well as a short behind the scenes documentary showing the band on tour. The album was not released in Australia.

Track listing
Cold Hard Bitch
Get What You Need
Sweet Young Thing
Rollover DJ
Look What You've Done
Lazy Gun
Are You Gonna Be My Girl
Hey Kids
Last Chance
Get Me Outta Here
Take It Or Leave It
Move On
That's Alright Mama

Music Videos
"Take It Or Leave It"
"Rollover DJ (Australia / UK)"
"Rollover DJ (International)"
"Look What You've Done (UK Version)"
"Are You Gonna Be My Girl"
"Cold Hard Bitch"

References

Jet (band) video albums
2004 compilation albums
2004 live albums
Live video albums
Music video compilation albums